The World Veterans Federation (WVF) is the world's largest international veteran organisation. The federation consists of 172 veterans organizations from 121 countries representing some 60 million veterans worldwide.

It is a humanitarian organisation, a charity and a peace activist movement. The WVF maintains its consultative status with the United Nations since 1951 and was conferred the title of "Peace Messenger" in 1987. The WVF was nominated for Nobel Peace Prize 8 times.

Aims

The principal aims of the WVF are to defend the spiritual and material interests of veterans and victims of war and their families by all available legal means and to maintain international peace and security by the application to the letter and in spirit of the Charter of the United Nations and by respecting the human rights and fundamental freedoms set forth in the International Bill of Human Rights.

History 

The WVF began on Sunday, 9 June 1946 when six Belgian and French veterans of the First World War gathered around a table at the "Maison du Peuple" in Brussels, Belgium to discuss the possibility of setting up a world association of war veterans. Present at the gathering were two Belgians, Mr. Joseph Neves and Mr. Jules William from the Democratic Union of Veterans, Disabled and War Victims,  and four Frenchmen, Mr. Albert Morel from the French Union of Veterans and War Victims Association (UFAC), Mr. G. Imbaud, Mr. G. Jerram and Mr. B. Meunier from the French Workers and Peasants Federation of Veterans.

Following the discussions in Brussels, veterans' organisations in other countries were contacted. On 23 October 1948, a congress attended by representatives from seven countries, namely Belgium, Brazil, France, Italy, the Netherlands, the Union of South Africa and Yugoslavia, adopted a resolution entitled "Setting up of a Provisional Body".

The resolution opened the way for the founding member associations to convene a constitutive assembly which was held at the UNESCO Headquarters in Paris, France, from 23 to 27 November 1950. Forty-three delegates and observers were present. The delegates were from Belgium (6), France (14), Italy (4), Turkey (2), the United States (9) and Yugoslavia (4), and the observers were from Denmark (1) and Finland (3). The founding member associations of the Netherlands and Luxembourg were unable to send their representatives but declared their agreement with the creation of the federation. There was no participation from countries from Africa, Asia and South America, although the Union of South Africa attended the congress in 1948 prior to the constitutive assembly in 1950.

On the final day of the assembly on 27 November 1950, the constitution of "The International Federation of War Veterans Organisations" (in French "Fédération internationale des organisations d'anciens combattants") was adopted.

The first elected executive committee members of the WVF were Mr. Albert Morel of France as president, Mr. Elliot Newcomb of the United States as secretary general, Mr. Roger Parmelan of France as treasurer general and Mr. Celebonovic of Yugoslavia, Mr. Mahmut Nedim Zapcı of Turkey, Mr. Joseph Neves of Belgium and Mr. Pietro Ricci of Italy as delegates.

The name of the federation was changed to "The World Veterans Federation" (in French "Fédération mondiale des anciens combattants") at the 2nd General Assembly, which was held in Belgrade, Yugoslavia from 27 to 30 November 1951. It was the first amendment to the WVF Constitution.

Founding members

The founding member associations were from Belgium (Democratic Union of War Veterans, Disabled and War Victims (UDCIM), France (French Union of War Veterans and War Victims Associations (UFAC), Italy (National Association of War Veterans and Repatriated Soldiers (ANCR) and National Association of War Disabled (ANMIG). Luxembourg (Luxembourg Association of Veterans of World War II and of the United Nations Forces (AACL), Netherlands (Netherlands Association of Military War Victims (BNMO), Turkey (Turkish Association of War Disabled, Widows and Orphans), United States (American Veterans Committee (AVC), American Veterans of World War II (AMVETS), Blinded Veterans Association (BVA) and Disabled American Veterans (DAV) and Yugoslavia (Federation of Veterans Associations of the People’s Liberation War of Yugoslavia (SUBNOR).

Changes in the WVF

There have been considerable changes in the WVF in the last 70 years. Its membership has grown from just a few associations from 8 countries to more than 170 associations from 121 countries. Its membership, which was confined to Europe and the United States in the early days, now covers all the continents of the world including a growing number of associations from developing countries.

The composition and the character of the WVF member associations have also changed. They are no longer confined to organisations made up of veterans and victims of the two world wars. Instead, the WVF membership is now made up of a mixture of various organisations representing veterans, ex-servicemen, victims of war, resistance fighters, former prisoners of war, former peace keepers and former peace builders whose individual interests, needs and priorities differ quite considerably from one another.

Organisation

Organisation and management

The WVF consists of the following permanent elements: a general assembly, an executive board, regional standing committees, a standing committee on women and a financial committee. It is managed by its executive board composed of the president, the deputy president, 6 vice presidents, the secretary general and the treasurer general. The headquarters of the WVF is in Paris, France.

Regional standing committees

The WVF has five regional standing committees:

Standing Committee on African Affairs (SCAA)
Standing Committee for Asia and the Pacific (SCAP)
Standing Committee on European Affairs (SCEA)
Standing Committee for Americas (SCA)
Standing Committee for Middle East (SCME), under establishment. 

The regional standing committees are composed of representatives from member organizations in the relevant geographical region. Each regional standing committee elects a chairperson from among its membership who is appointed ex officio vice president of the WVF.

Standing Committee on Women (SCOW)

The Standing Committee on Women is composed of designated representatives for women's affairs from WVF member organizations and the chairpersons of the Working Groups on Women established within each of the Regional Standing Committees. The Committee elects a Chairperson from among its membership who is appointed ex officio Vice President of the WVF.

Members 

As of 2006, the following organizations were members of the WVF.

Africa 
Algerian National Organisation of Moujahidines
War Veterans Association of the People's Republic of Angola
Association of War Disabled Ex-Servicemen of Angola
National Union of War Veterans, Holders of the War Veterans' Certificate and Victims of War of Benin
War Veterans, Ex-Servicemen, Widows and Orphans Association (Burkina Faso)
Fraternal Association of Solidarity and Economic Mutual Aid of Veterans and War Victims in Cameroon
National Office for War Veterans, Ex-Servicemen and Victims of War of Cameroon
Fraternal Union of War Veterans of the French Armies of Chad
National Veterans Union (Republic of the Congo)
National Federation of Associations of Overseas Veterans and Servicemen (Republic of the Congo)
National Office of War Veterans and War Victims of the Republic of Congo
National Union of Congolese War Veterans (Democratic Republic of the Congo)
Association of War Veterans of Cote d'Ivoire
Egyptian Veterans and War Victims Association
Ancient Ethiopian Patriots Association
Veterans Administration, Ghana
Association of Fighters for the Freedom of the Homeland (Guinea-Bissau)
National Union of War Veterans and War Victims of the Republic of Guinea
Lesotho Retired Military Officers Club
Libyan League for Families of Martyrs, Prisoners of War and War Wounded
Association of War Veterans and War Victims of Madagascar
National Association of War Veterans and War Victims of the Republic of Mali
National Association of War Veterans (Morocco)
National Council for Former Resistants and Former Members of the Liberation Army (Morocco)
Office of the High Commissioner for Former Resistants and Members of the Liberation Army (Morocco)
Association of Military and Paramilitary Disabled Servicemen of Mozambique
Combatant's Association of National Liberation Struggle of Mozambique
Namibia War Veterans Trust 
National Association of War Veterans and War Victims of Niger
Nigerian Legion
National Federation of War Veterans and War Victims of Senegal
Sierra Leone Ex-Servicemen's Association
Council of Military Veterans' Organisations of the Republic of South Africa
South African National Military Veterans Association
Sudanese Veterans Association
Umbutfo Swaziland Defence Force Ex-Servicemen's Association
Tunisian Association of War Veterans and Victims of War
National Association "Fidelity for the Rights of Families of Veterans who Fought with France"
Zimbabwe National Liberation War Veterans Association

Asia 
Cambodia Veterans Association
Indian Ex-Services League
Veterans Legion of the Republic of Indonesia
Veterans and War Victims Foundation of Iran
Association of Disabled Veterans of the Fight against Nazism (Israel)
Association of Disabled Veterans of World War II (Israel)
Israel Defense Forces Veterans of War Association
Organization of Partisans, Underground & Ghetto Fighters in Israel
Zahal Disabled Veterans Organization (Israel)
Japan Disabled Veterans Association
Jordanian Economic & Social Ass. For Retired Servicemen & Veterans
Korea Disabled Veterans Organization
Korean Veterans Association
Retirees Service Administration (Kuwait)
Kuwaiti Kinsfolk Association of Martyrs, Captives and Missing
Ex-Services Association of Malaysia
Malaysian Armed Forces Veterans Council
Royal Malay Regiment Officers' Club
Nepal National Ex-Servicemen's Association
Association of Palestinian Revolution Ex-Warriors
Pakistan Armed Services Board
Confederation of Filipino Veterans
Philippines Veterans Legion
Veterans Federation of the Philippines
Singapore Armed Forces Veterans' League
Sri Lanka Ex-Services Association
Association of Veterans and Victims of War (Syria)
Veterans Affairs Council (R.O.C on Taiwan)
Veterans Association of Republic of China（VAROC） （R.O.C on Taiwan）
Association of Veterans of the National Liberation War of Timor Leste
War Veterans Organization of Thailand
Veterans Association of Vietnam
Organization of Veterans of the Yemen Revolution and the Defense of Unification
The Veterans Legion of the Republic of Indonesia (LVRI)

Europe 
National Organisation of Veterans of the Anti-Fascist National Liberation Struggle of the People of Albania
Unified Organisation of Veterans of the Anti-fascist Struggle of Liberation of the Albanian People
Austrian Association of Victims of War and of Disabled
Association of the Volunteers and Veterans of the Homeland War HVO H-B
Association of veterans of the People's Liberation & Antifascist War of Bosnia & Herzegovina (1941-1945)
Bosnia & Herzegovina Association of War Disabled Veterans
Union of Association of Veterans of People's Liberation War (1941-1945) SUBNOR in the Rep. Srpska
United Veterans Organization – Veterans Union of Bosnia & Herzegovina
Veterans Organization of the Srpska Republic
War Veterans Union (Bulgaria)
Antifascist Combatants' Association of the Rep. of Croatia
Association of Croatian Patriotic War Veterans
Croatian Association of Prisoners in Serbian Concentration Camps
Croatian Homeland Volunteer War Volunteer Veterans Association
Croatian War Veterans Association
Union of Associations of Croatian Defence Force Veterans
Union of Associations of Croatian Defenders Treated for PTSD
Union of Croatian Homeland War Volunteers Associations
Veterans Motorcycle Club - Croatia
Cyprus Veterans Association World War II
Association of Czech Legionaries
Czech Veteran's Association
Blue Berets Denmark
Disabled War Veterans Association of Finland
Federation of Women Veterans in Finland
Finnish War Veterans Federation
Union of Front Veterans Soldiers
Peacekeepers Association Finland
Union Française des Associations de Combattants (France)
Union nationale des combattants (France)
German Federal Armed Forces Association
Advisory Council on Voluntary Reservist Activities to the German Armed Forces Reservist's Association
National General Confederation of Greek War Disabled and Victims
Union Panhellenique des Anciens Combattants de la Résistance Nationale (Greece)
Panhellenic Union of Veterans from the National Resistance
Hungarian Federation of Resistance Fighters and Antifascists
Hungarian Alliance of Military Fellowship
National Association of War Veterans and Repatriated Soldiers (Italy)
National Association of Families of the War Dead and Missing (Italy)
National Association of War Disabled
National Association of Italian Partisans
Italian Federation of Volunteers for Freedom
Institute of the Blue Ribbon
Luxemburg Association of Veterans of World War II, of the United Nations Forces and of Luxemburg Peace Soldiers
Kosovo Liberation Army War Veterans Organization
Union of Veterans from the National Liberation and Antifascist War of Macedonia 1941-1945
Union of Associations of Antifascists of Montenegro
National Council of the Former Dutch Resistance Movement
Netherlands Association of Military War Victims
Norwegian Veterans Association for International Operations
War Veterans Council of Norway
Association of Combatants of the Polish Republic and Former Political Prisoners
Association of War Disabled Persons of the Polish Republic
World Association of Home Army Soldiers (Poland)
UN Peacekeeping Missions Veterans Association (Poland)
Association of Armed Forces Handicapped (Portugal)
Veterans League (Portugal)
National Association of War Veterans (Romania)
Alliance of the Associations of the former fighters of the People's Liberation War in Serbia
Association of Disabled War Veterans and Peacetime Military Invalids of Serbia
Slovak Antifascist Fighters Association
Association of Veterans of the War for Slovenia
Federation of Disabled War Veterans Associations of Slovenia
Union of the Associations of the War Veterans and Participants of the National Liberation Struggle of Slovenia
Sever Association of Police Veterans Societies (Slovenia)
Federation of Associations and Clubs MORiS (Slovenia)
Association of Invalid Militaries and Civil Guards of Spain
Association of Swedish Field Hospital for Korea
Swedish Veterans Federation
British Members' Council
British Limbless Ex-Service Men's Association
Ex-Services Mental Welfare Society (Combat Stress)
Blind Veterans UK
Royal British Legion
War Widows Association of Great Britain

Former Soviet Union 
Council of Veterans of War, Labour & Armed Forces of the Azerbaijan Republic
Association of War Veterans from the Afghanistan War (Belarus)
Veterans Organisation of the Republic of Belarus
Union of Veterans Organisations of the Estonian Republic
Union of War and Military Veterans of Georgia
Veterans Defense Fund of Georgia
Veterans and Soldiers Union of War and Military Forces of Georgia: Vaziani Union
Caucasus Veterans Centre (Georgia)
Georgian War, Armed Forces and Conflict Veterans' Union "Veterans for Peace"
Latvian Association of Fighters of Anti-Hitler Coalition
Lithuanian Committee of the World War II Antihitlerite Coalition Veterans Org.
All Russia Non-Governmental Organization "Russian Union of Afghanistan Veterans"
All Russia Public Organization of Veterans Battle Brotherhood
National Russian Public Organization of War and Military Service Veterans
All-Ukrainian Union of War Veterans
Ukrainian Union of War Veterans of Afghanistan
Association of International Veteran Soldiers of Uzbekistan

Latin America 
Veterans Centre of Lujan - Buenos Aires (Argentina)
Brazilian War Veterans Association
Association of Combatants of the Cuban Revolution
Mexican Association of WWII Veterans

Oceania 
Netherlands Ex-Servicemen and Women's Association in Australia
Royal Australian Air Force Association
Royal Australian Army Nursing Corps Association

United States 
American Veterans Committee 
American Veterans Committee (1943-2008)
American Veterans of World War II-Korea-Vietnam-AMVETS
Disabled American Veterans
Past National Commanders Organization
Veterans For Peace
Vietnam Assistance for the Handicapped
Paralyzed Veterans of America

Activities

Advocacy and humanitarian activities

The most important function of the WVF is to promote and protect the well-being of veterans and victims of war worldwide. Most of the issues it deals with are essentially social or humanitarian in nature. It is very much involved in the promotion of social justice, the enhancement of the quality of life and the development of the full potential of each individual within the veteran and the victims of war community. Most of these activities are carried out in the form of advocacy through the United Nations, governments, veteran organisations and the general public. At the same time, the WVF functions as a charity by providing direct and indirect aid and assistance to its members and non-members.

Global peace movement

As a responsible member of the international community, the WVF supports and assists the United Nations in their effort to promote international peace and security. One of the ways it does this is by organising an annual global "Veterans Walk for Peace" event on 21 September, the International Day of Peace. On this day the veteran community worldwide leads all the peace-loving people of the world and their governments to observe the International Day of Peace – the day of global ceasefire and non-violence.

WVF Credo 

"None can speak more eloquently for peace than thosewho have fought in war.The voices of war veterans are a reflection of the longing for peaceof people the world over, who within a generation have twicesuffered the unspeakable catastrophe of world war.Humanity has earned the right to peace.Without it, there can be no hope for the future.And without hope, man is lost.The voice of the people must be heeded.They aspire to a richer life in freedom, equality and dignity,as in things material; they pray for peace.Their will for peace and a better life can be, must be, crystallizedinto an irresistible force against war, aggression and degradation.The people have had to work and sacrifice for wars.They will work more willingly for peace.Let there be a dedicated effort, a greater crusadethan history has ever known, for a world ofpeace, freedom and equality."

Ralph Bunche
Nobel Peace Prize, 1950

References

Organizations established in 1950
Veterans' organizations
International nongovernmental organizations
International organisations based in Switzerland